The Irrigator, formerly The Murrumbidgee Irrigator, is a weekly newspaper published in Leeton, New South Wales, Australia, since 1915.

History 
The Murrumbidgee Irrigator was first published on 23 April 1915 only a few years after the establishment of the town. Its circulation included Barellan, Brobenah, Darlington Point, Leeton, Mirrool, Whitton, Wilbriggie, and Yanco. It changed hands a number of times. John Joseph Sullivan owned the paper early in its history, while it was later acquired by Rupert Henderson, who was first general manager of John Fairfax & Sons and later managing director.

In November 2001, it was renamed The Irrigator and remains in publication under this name.

Digitisation 
The paper has been digitised as part of the Australian Newspapers Digitisation Program of the National Library of Australia.

See also 
 Irrigation Record  newspaper published in Leeton, 1913-1917
 List of newspapers in Australia
 List of newspapers in New South Wales

References

External links 
 
 

Newspapers published in New South Wales
Leeton, New South Wales
Newspapers on Trove
Weekly newspapers published in Australia